Pal (June 4, 1940 – June 18, 1958) was a male Rough Collie performer and the first in a line of such dogs to portray the fictional female collie Lassie in film, on radio, and on television. Pal was born in California in 1940 and eventually brought to the notice of Rudd Weatherwax, a Hollywood animal trainer. In 1943, the dog was chosen to play Lassie in the Metro-Goldwyn-Mayer feature film Lassie Come Home. Following his film debut, Pal starred in six more Lassie films for MGM from the mid-1940s to early 1950s, then appeared briefly in shows, fairs, and rodeos around the United States before starring in the two pilots filmed in 1954 for the television series, Lassie. Pal retired after filming the television pilots, and died in June 1958.  He sired a line of descendants who continued to play the fictional character he originated. In 1992, The Saturday Evening Post said Pal had "the most spectacular canine career in film history".

Birth and early years
Pal was born at Cherry Osborne's Glamis Kennels in North Hollywood on June 4, 1940.  The son of Red Brucie of Glamis and Bright Bauble of Glamis, Pal's  ancestry is traced to the nineteenth century and England's first great collie, "Old Cockie".  Because of his large eyes and the white blaze on his forehead, Pal was judged not of the highest standards and sold as a pet-quality dog.

Howard Peck, an animal trainer, brought the eight-month-old collie to Hollywood animal trainer Rudd Weatherwax in order to break the animal of uncontrolled barking and a habit of chasing motorcycles. After working with the dog, Weatherwax gained control of the barking but was unable to break Pal of his motorcycle-chasing habit. Peck was disappointed with the results and gave the dog to Weatherwax in exchange for the money Peck owed him. Weatherwax, in turn, gave the dog to a friend, but when he learned that Eric Knight's 1940 novel, Lassie Come-Home, was being considered as a feature film by MGM, Weatherwax sensed Pal was the dog to fill the role, and bought Pal back from his friend for $10 USD. Peck later tried to reclaim him after he became famous as Lassie, but Weatherwax's legal ownership was upheld. Rudd's brother Frank Weatherwax, who trained dogs for such films as The 5,000 Fingers of Dr. T and The Wizard of Oz, assisted Rudd in training Pal.

MGM films
The first MGM "Lassie" film was planned as a low budget, black and white children's film. Pal was among 1,500 dogs who auditioned for the title role, but was rejected because he was male, his eyes were too big, his head too flat, and a white blaze ran down his forehead. A female prize-winning show collie was hired to play the title character. Weatherwax was hired to train the star, and Pal was hired as a stunt dog.

During the course of filming, a decision was made to take advantage of a massive flooding of the San Joaquin River in central California in order to obtain some spectacular footage for the film. The female collie was still in training and refused to enter the raging waters created by the flood. Weatherwax was on the site with Pal and offered to have his dog perform in a five-stage shot in which Pal would swim the river, haul himself out, lie down without shaking the water off his coat, attempt to crawl while lying on his side and finally lie motionless, completely exhausted. Pal performed exceptionally well and the scene was completed in one take. Weatherwax said director Fred M. Wilcox was so impressed with Pal during the sequence that he had "tears in his eyes." In response, producers released the female collie and hired Pal in her stead, reshooting the first six weeks of the filming with Pal now portraying Lassie. Other sources say that the female collie was replaced because she began to shed excessively during shooting of the film in the summer. In any case, MGM executives were so impressed, they upgraded the production to an A film with full advertising support, top publicity and filming in Technicolor. Pal went through his paces with enthusiasm, rarely required multiple retakes, and did his own stunt work.

Pal's success in Lassie Come Home in 1943 led to six more MGM films: Son of Lassie (a sequel to Lassie Come Home), Courage of Lassie, Hills of Home, The Sun Comes Up, Challenge to Lassie, and The Painted Hills.  In his earlier years with MGM, Rudd  Weatherwax was assisted by Frank Inn,  who, for fourteen years, trained Lassies and later supplied animals for the 1954 Lassie television series.

Following The Painted Hills in 1951, MGM executives felt Lassie had run her course and planned no future films featuring the character. MGM executives then sought a way to break Weatherwax's contract. Weatherwax was concerned about protecting Pal and the Lassie image he had created from future diminishment at the hands of others. In lieu of US$40,000 in back pay owed him by the studio, Weatherwax bargained for and received the Lassie name and trademark.

Television series
Following their departure from MGM, Pal and Weatherwax went on the road performing an 18-minute program at dog shows and department stores. Television producer Robert Maxwell convinced Weatherwax that Pal's future lay in television. Together, the men created a boy-and-his-dog scenario about a struggling family on a weatherbeaten farm in Middle America.

The field for the role of the boy in Lassie  was narrowed to three young actors, but the final decision was left to Pal. After spending a week with the boys at Weatherwax's North Hollywood home, Pal seemed to like eleven-year-old Tommy Rettig more than the other two. Rettig won the role based on Pal's response, and filming for the two pilots began in the summer of 1954, with Pal portraying Lassie in both.

After viewing the pilots, CBS executives immediately signed the 30-minute show to its fall 1954 schedule. Pal retired after filming the two pilots, and his son, Lassie Junior (who was three years old and had been in training for a couple of years), stepped into the television role.  Pal would come to the show's studio home at Stage One of KTTV in Los Angeles every day with his son during filming.  He had a bed behind the set, and was respectfully termed The Old Man.  Series star Tommy Rettig later recalled, "When Rudd would ask Lassie, Jr. to do something, if you were behind the set, you could see The Old Man get up from his bed and go through the routine back there."

Death
By 1957, Pal was growing blind, deaf, and stiff, and rarely visited the Lassie set. The star of the show Jon Provost later recalled, "As young as I was, I recognized how much that dog meant to Rudd. Rudd loved that old dog as much as anyone could love an animal or person."

Pal died of natural causes in June 1958 at age 18, which is about 85 in "dog years" for his Rough Collie breed; and for months Weatherwax slipped in and out of deep depression. Robert Weatherwax, Rudd's son, later recalled, "It hit him very hard when Pal died. He buried him in a special place on the ranch and would often visit the grave. Dad would never again watch an MGM Lassie movie. He just couldn't bear to see Pal. He didn't want to have to be reminded of just how much he loved that dog."

Legacy
In 1950, Rudd Weatherwax and co-author John H. Rothwell co-wrote a book about Pal's life called The Story of Lassie: His Discovery and Training from Puppyhood to Stardom.

Several descendants of Pal played the fictional Lassie character following their progenitor's death. On the original television series (1954–73), Pal's son, Lassie Junior, and his grandsons, Spook and Baby, worked the first several seasons. Mire appeared in a few of the Ranger seasons, and Hey Hey worked the final two syndicated seasons.

The casting of non-Pal bloodline collies in the role of Lassie has met with protest. In 1997, a Lassie television series debuted on the Animal Planet network but without a Weatherwax-trained dog as Lassie. A protest campaign was waged, and producers brought a ninth generation Weatherwax dog to the show.  The 2005–2006 remake of the original Lassie movie provoked comment when a non-Pal bloodline collie was cast in the title role.  Robert Weatherwax has disputed the casting of non-Pal bloodline dogs in the role of Lassie.

In 2000, the Lassie trademark was sold by the eight remaining members of the Weatherwax family to Classic Media (which in 2012, Classic Media was acquired by DreamWorks Animation and renamed into DreamWorks Classics and ultimately became the property of trademarks' current owners, Universal Studios as of 2016). In 2004, Robert Weatherwax's personal contract to supply a dog to play the role of Lassie ended and neither side pursued a renewal.   After several years of stand-in collies that were not related to the line, Classic Media contracted with Carol Riggins, who had been co-trainer with Robert Weatherwax, and her 9th generation dog HeyHey, who had played the role of Lassie during the last 13 episodes of the Canada Lassie series under the Weatherwax Trained Dogs banner.   Carol Riggins continues today as the official owner and trainer of Lassie with another "Pal", a 10th generation direct descendant of the original Pal.

Filmography

Film

Television

See also
 List of individual dogs

References

External links

1940 animal births
1958 animal deaths
Dog actors
Lassie
Metro-Goldwyn-Mayer contract players
Individual dogs in the United States